Yudong may refer to the following locations in China:

 Yudong Station (Yúdòng Zhàn), on Line 3 of Chongqing Rail Transit
 Yudong Bridge, Chongqing (Yúdòng Qiáo)
 Yudong Subdistrict, Huangshan (Yùdōng Jiēdào), in Tunxi District, Huangshan City, Anhui
 Yudong Subdistrict, Shijiazhuang (Yùdōng Jiēdào), in Yuhua District, Shijiazhuang, Hebei
 Yudong, Jiangsu (Yúdōng Zhèn), town in Haimen